Henry Stern may refer to:

Henry Aaron Stern (1820–1885), Anglican missionary
Henry Stern (New York politician) (1935–2019), commissioner of the New York City Department of Parks and Recreation
Henry Stern (California politician) (born 1982), California state senator
Henry Stern, finalist in a Magic: The Gathering World Championship
Henry Stern, screenwriter of Paper Dolls

See also
Harry Stern, mayor of Cumberland, Maryland
Henry Sterns, American bobsledder